Edict of Emancipation may refer to:

 The Emancipation Proclamation, an 1863 directive by President Abraham Lincoln during the American Civil War
 The Prussian Edict of Emancipation, the granting of Prussian citizenship to all Jews in 1812 during the Prussian reforms 
 Emancipation reform of 1861, liquidation of serfdom in the Russian Empire